Cointe Observatory, situated in the district of  in Liège, Belgium, was built by the University of Liège in 1881-82 to plans by the architect Lambert Noppius.

The building, in a medieval revival style, is sited in a private park formerly the estate of the wealthy industrialist Vanderheyden de Hauzeur family. It accommodated the university's Institute of Astrophysics, later the Institute of Astrophysics and Geophysics, until 2002, when the Institute was moved to the Sart-Tilman campus.

As of 2008 the building was occupied by the Société Astronomique de Liège, but was in the course of renovation with the intention that it should house the Service Régional des Fouilles Archéologiques.

See also
 List of astronomical observatories

References

Sources
 Houziaux, L. (ed. Eugène Wahle) 1981: L'astronomie et l'astrophysique dans Apports de Liège au progrès des sciences et des techniques

External link

Astronomical observatories in Belgium
University of Liège
1881 establishments in Belgium
Buildings and structures in Liège